Enshū-ryū (遠州流) is a school of Japanese tea ceremony and also of ikebana, the art of flower arrangement. Another school is the Kobori Enshū-ryū.

It originated with Lord Kobori Enshū (1579–1647).

Ikebana 

The branches of the ikebana school are numerous. They include:

 Nihonbashi Enshū-ryū (日本橋遠州流)
 Shin Enshū-ryū
 Ango Enshū-ryū	
 Miyako Enshū-ryū (都遠州流)
 Seifu Enshū-ryū	
 Asakusa Enshū-ryū

References

External links 

 Official homepage of Enshū-ryū
 Official homepage of Kobori Enshū-ryū
 Official homepage of Kadō Enshū

Chadō
Kadō schools